In Greek mythology, Pisidice (Peisidíkē) or Peisidice, was one of the following individuals:

 Pisidice, a Thessalian princess as the daughter of King Aeolus of Aeolia and Enarete, daughter of Deimachus. She was the sister of Salmoneus, Athamas, Sisyphus, Cretheus, Perieres, Deioneus, Magnes, Calyce, Canace, Alcyone and Perimede. Peisidice was the mother of Antiphus and Actor by Myrmidon. She may also be the mother of Myrmidon's other children: Erysichthon, Dioplethes, Hiscilla and Eupolemeia.
 Pisidice, an alternate name for Demonice, mother of Thestius by Ares.
 Pisidice, a princess of Iolcus as the daughter of Pelias, who, together with her sisters, killed their father, as Medea tricked them into believing this was needed to rejuvenate him.
 Pisidice, a Pylian princess and daughter of King Nestor and Anaxibia or Eurydice. She was sister to Polycaste, Perseus, Stratichus, Aretus, Echephron, Pisistratus, Antilochus and Thrasymedes. She was probably the Pisidice who became the mother of Borus by Periclymenus, brother of Nestor and consequently her uncle.
 Pisidice, a princess of Methymna, who fell in love with Achilles as he besieged her city, and promised to put Methymna into his possession if he would marry her. He agreed to her terms but, as soon as the city was his, he ordered that she be stoned to death as a traitor.
Pisidice, a Boeotian princess as the daughter of King Leucon. She was the mother of Argynnos, who was loved by Agamemnon and drowned in River Cephissus.

Notes

Princesses in Greek mythology
Aeolides

References 

 Apollonius Rhodius, Argonautica translated by Robert Cooper Seaton (1853-1915), R. C. Loeb Classical Library Volume 001. London, William Heinemann Ltd, 1912. Online version at the Topos Text Project.
Apollonius Rhodius, Argonautica. George W. Mooney. London. Longmans, Green. 1912. Greek text available at the Perseus Digital Library. 
Athenaeus of Naucratis, The Deipnosophists or Banquet of the Learned. London. Henry G. Bohn, York Street, Covent Garden. 1854. Online version at the Perseus Digital Library. 
Athenaeus of Naucratis, Deipnosophistae. Kaibel. In Aedibus B.G. Teubneri. Lipsiae. 1887. Greek text available at the Perseus Digital Library. 
Claudius Aelianus, Varia Historia translated by Thomas Stanley (d.1700) edition of 1665. Online version at the Topos Text Project. 
Claudius Aelianus, Claudii Aeliani de natura animalium libri xvii, varia historia, epistolae, fragmenta, Vol 2. Rudolf Hercher. In Aedibus B.G. Teubneri. Lipsiae. 1866. Greek text available at the Perseus Digital Library.  
Hesiod, Catalogue of Women from Homeric Hymns, Epic Cycle, Homerica translated by Evelyn-White, H G. Loeb Classical Library Volume 57. London: William Heinemann, 1914. Online version at theio.com 
 Homer, The Odyssey with an English Translation by A.T. Murray, PH.D. in two volumes. Cambridge, MA., Harvard University Press; London, William Heinemann, Ltd. 1919. Online version at the Perseus Digital Library. Greek text available from the same website.
 Gaius Julius Hyginus, Astronomica from The Myths of Hyginus translated and edited by Mary Grant. University of Kansas Publications in Humanistic Studies. Online version at the Topos Text Project.
Parthenius, Love Romances translated by Sir Stephen Gaselee (1882-1943), S. Loeb Classical Library Volume 69. Cambridge, MA. Harvard University Press. 1916.  Online version at the Topos Text Project.
Gaius Julius Hyginus, Fabulae from The Myths of Hyginus translated and edited by Mary Grant. University of Kansas Publications in Humanistic Studies. Online version at the Topos Text Project.
 Parthenius, Erotici Scriptores Graeci, Vol. 1. Rudolf Hercher. in aedibus B. G. Teubneri. Leipzig. 1858. Greek text available at the Perseus Digital Library.
 Pseudo-Apollodorus, The Library with an English Translation by Sir James George Frazer, F.B.A., F.R.S. in 2 Volumes, Cambridge, MA, Harvard University Press; London, William Heinemann Ltd. 1921. Online version at the Perseus Digital Library. Greek text available from the same website.
 Plutarch, Morals translated from the Greek by several hands. Corrected and revised by. William W. Goodwin, PH. D. Boston. Little, Brown, and Company. Cambridge. Press Of John Wilson and son. 1874. 5. Online version at the Perseus Digital Library.
 Stephanus of Byzantium, Stephani Byzantii Ethnicorum quae supersunt, edited by August Meineike (1790-1870), published 1849. A few entries from this important ancient handbook of place names have been translated by Brady Kiesling. Online version at the Topos Text Project.

Family of Athamas
Children of Nestor (mythology)
Princesses in Greek mythology
Characters from Iolcus
Boeotian characters in Greek mythology
Pylian characters in Greek mythology
Thessalian characters in Greek mythology
Boeotian mythology
Thessalian mythology
Patricides